Snowdrift Lake (also, Murphy Lakes) is a lake in Grand County, Colorado, United States. It is part of Rocky Mountain National Park. Snowdrift Lake lies at an elevation of 11069 feet (3374 m), below Snowdrift Peak.

References

Lakes of Rocky Mountain National Park
Lakes of Grand County, Colorado